Louis Ginzberg (Levy Gintzburg; , Levy Ginzberg; November 28, 1873 – November 11, 1953) was a Russian-born American rabbi and Talmudic scholar of Lithuanian-Jewish descent, contributing editor to numerous articles of The Jewish Encyclopedia (1906), and leading figure in the Conservative movement of Judaism during the early 20th century. He was born in Kaunas, Vilna Governorate (then called Kovno) and died in New York City.

Biographical background

Ginzberg was born into a religious Lithuanian-Jewish family whose piety and erudition was well known. The family traced its lineage back to the revered Talmudist, halakhic scholar, and kabbalist master Gaon of Vilna. Ginzberg sought to emulate the Vilna Gaon's intermingling of "academic knowledge" in Torah studies under the label "historical Judaism"; for example, in his book Students, Scholars and Saints, Ginzberg quotes the Vilna Gaon's instruction, "Do not regard the views of the Shulchan Aruch as binding if you think that they are not in agreement with those of the Talmud."

He wrote in his memoirs that he felt saddened that he had grieved his father, as he recognized that his pious father was disappointed that his son had chosen a more liberal path with regards to Jewish law in contrast to those of his forefathers. Ginzberg first arrived in America in 1899, unsure where he belonged or what he should pursue. Almost immediately, he accepted a position at Hebrew Union College and subsequently wrote articles for the Jewish Encyclopedia. Still, he had not found his niche.

Judaism studied in a historical context
In 1903, he began teaching at the Jewish Theological Seminary of America (JTS) in New York City, where he taught until his death. Throughout his life, all of his works were infused with the belief that Judaism and Jewish history could not be understood properly without a firm grasp of Jewish law. Instead of just studying the halakha, Louis Ginzberg wrote responsa, i.e. formal responses to questions of Jewish law.

Many of Ginzberg's Orthodox Jewish peers had deep reservations about his choice to work at JTS. The seminary explicitly encouraged its faculty and students to study rabbinical literature within its social and historical context; this was sometimes known as Wissenschaft des Judentums, or the "scientific study of Judaism." As a result of this, most Orthodox Jews viewed his works as unacceptable, and virtually none refer to them, much less rely on them, today.

On account of his impressive scholarship in Jewish studies, Ginzberg was one of sixty scholars honored with a doctorate by Harvard University in celebration of its tercentenary. Ginzberg's knowledge made him the expert to defend Judaism both in national and international affairs. In 1906, he defended the Jewish community against anti-Semitic accusations that Jews ritually slaughtered Gentiles. In 1913, Louis Marshall requested that Ginzberg refute the Beilis blood libel charge in Kyiv.

Legacy at the Jewish Theological Seminary
Ginzberg began teaching the Talmud at the Jewish Theological Seminary of America (JTS) from its reorganization in 1902 until his death in 1953. For fifty years he trained two generations of future Conservative rabbis. During his era, Ginzberg influenced almost every rabbi of the Conservative movement in a personal way. For some, Louis Ginzberg serves as a role model even today. Today's leading Conservative posek in Israel, rabbi David Golinkin, has written profusely on Louis Ginzberg. Golinkin has recently published a collection of responsa containing 93 questions answered by Ginzberg.

In the opening address, Ginzberg spoke of the need to keep Conservative Jewry under the rubric of halakha. The conception that in religious matters anyone, however ignorant, can judge for himself, is the direct denial of the old Jewish maxim, 'The ignorant cannot be pious' (Avot 2:5)…  The majority vote of a Board of Directors of a synagogue is, after all, a negligible quantity when it is in opposition to the vote of historical Judaism with its myriad of Saints and thousands of Sages…The sorting, distributing, selecting, harmonizing and completing can only be done by experienced hands. Ginzberg's initiative to base halakhic decisions on law committees and not laymen is the method the Conservative movement describes as its present one till today.

In 1918, at the Sixth Annual Convention, Ginzberg, as the acting president, declared that United Synagogue of Conservative Judaism stood for 'historical Judaism' and thus elaborates:

"Now let us understand the exact meaning of the expression historical Judaism…Looking at Judaism from a historical point of view, we become convinced that there is no one aspect deep enough to exhaust the content of such a complex phenomenon as Judaism…Accordingly, Torah-less Judaism… would be an entirely new thing and not the continuation of something given…

Responsa on wine during Prohibition
One of his responsa concerns the use of wine in the Jewish community during the Prohibition Era. The Eighteenth Amendment to the United States Constitution, ratified on January 16, 1920, declared that "the manufacture, sale, or transportation of intoxicating liquors within... the United States... for beverage purposes is hereby prohibited." The subsequent Volstead Act defined "intoxicating liquors" and provided for several exceptions, one of which as for sacramental use. The Christian Church was able to successfully regulate the use of ceremonial wine. The clergy could easily monitor the nominal amount of sacramental wine that each worshipper drank, especially because it was usually drunk only in Church and only on Sundays (for the communion or Eucharist ceremony).

This was not the case for the Jews. Jews needed a greater quantity of wine per person. Furthermore, the wine was drunk in the privacy of the home on Shabbat, Jewish holidays, weddings, and brit milah (circumcision ceremonies). This alone would have made the regulation of ceremonial wine complicated. It was not difficult for crooks to rig illegal "wine synagogues" to trick the government to receive their wine which would then be bootlegged.

While contemporary Orthodox Jewish authorities are generally permissive of grape juice as a wine substitute, Orthodox rabbis of the 1920s soundly rejected its use. The Reform movement in 1920 proclaimed that grape juice be used instead of wine to eliminate future complaints. Shortly afterwards, on January 24, 1922, the Conservative movement publicized the 71-page response written by Ginzberg tackling the halakhic aspects of drinking grape juice instead of wine in light of the historical circumstances. Besides Ginzberg's well-grounded decision to permit grape juice, he includes meta-halakhic reasoning:

"…The decision of the author of Magen Abraham that the commandment is honored best by the use of old wine is rejected. Even this authority would admit that it is better to pronounce the Kiddush over new wine than to desecrate the Divine Name and to disgrace the Jewish people, and we well know the damage caused the Jewish people by the trafficking in sacramental wine."

At the time of Ginzburg's responsum, the Orthodox rabbinate had exclusive authority to sanction sacramental wine for Jews, and the responsum was thought by the Orthodox community to be tainted by self-interest.

Works
Ginzberg was the author of a number of scholarly Jewish works, including a commentary on Talmud Yerushalmi (the Jerusalem Talmud) and his six-volume (plus a one-volume index) The Legends of the Jews, (1909) which combined hundreds of legends and parables from a lifetime of midrash research.

Legends of the Jews is an original synthesis of a vast amount of aggadah from all of classical rabbinic literature, as well as apocryphal, pseudopigraphical and even early Christian literature, with legends ranging from the creation of the world and the fall of Adam, through a huge collection of legends on Moses, and ending with the story of Esther and the Jews in Persia. Ginzberg had an encyclopedic knowledge of all rabbinic literature, and his masterwork included a massive array of aggadot. However he did not create an anthology which showed these aggadot distinctly. Rather, he paraphrased them and rewrote them into one continuous narrative that covered four volumes, followed by two volumes of footnotes that give specific sources. See Jewish folklore and Aggadah.

Apart from Legends of the Jews, perhaps his best known scholarly work was his Geonica (1909), an account of the Babylonian Geonim containing lengthy extracts from their responsa, as discovered in the form of fragments in the Cairo Genizah.  This work was continued by him in the similar collection entitled Ginze Schechter (1929).

Professor Ginzberg wrote 406 articles and several monograph-length entries for the Jewish Encyclopedia (Levy 2002), some later collected in his Legend and Lore. He was an important halakhic authority of the Conservative movement in North America; for a period of ten years (1917–1927), he was virtually the halakhic authority of this movement.  He was also founder and president of the American Academy of Jewish Research.

Many of his halakhic responsa are collected in The Responsa of Professor Louis Ginzberg, ed. David Golinkin, NY: JTS, 1996.

Personal life 
Ginzberg had a long term platonic relationship with Henrietta Szold, who was his editor at JPS. She was in love with him, but was 13 years older than him.

Ginzberg visited Berlin in 1908 and became engaged to Adele Katzenstein while he was there. Katzestein was about 22 at the time. They had two children. Son Eli Ginzberg (1911–2002) was a professor of economics at Columbia University. The second child was a daughter, Sophie Ginzberg Gould (1914–1985).

References

External links
 Excerpts from The Responsa of Professor Louis Ginzberg
 Loeb Family Tree
 
 
 

19th-century Lithuanian rabbis
19th-century Jewish theologians
20th-century American rabbis
20th-century Jewish theologians
1873 births
1953 deaths
American Conservative rabbis
American Jewish theologians
American people of Lithuanian-Jewish descent
Emigrants from the Russian Empire to the United States
Jewish Theological Seminary of America people
Rabbis from Kaunas
Talmudists
Writers from Kaunas